The Irish state has officially approved the following List of National Monuments in County Kilkenny. In the Republic of Ireland, a structure or site may be deemed to be a "National Monument", and therefore worthy of state protection, if it is of national importance. If the land adjoining the monument is essential to protect it, this land may also be protected.

National Monuments 

|}

See also
 List of National Monuments of Ireland

References 

 

Kilkenny
National Monuments